Raymond Reaux (18 December 1940 – 20 September 2021) was a French cyclist. He competed at the 1960 Summer Olympics in the individual road race and finished in 50th place. He finished second in the Paris-Arras race in 1959 and in the Circuit Franco-Belge race in 1963.

References 

1940 births
2021 deaths
Cyclists at the 1960 Summer Olympics
Olympic cyclists of France
French male cyclists
Sportspeople from Pas-de-Calais
Cyclists from Hauts-de-France